Correbia obscura is a moth of the subfamily Arctiinae. It was described by Schaus in 1905. It is found in French Guiana.

References

Euchromiina
Moths described in 1905